Three Ravinia Drive is a skyscraper located in the city of Dunwoody, in metropolitan Atlanta. Ravinia was developed by Gerald Hines Interests of Houston, Texas, in 1991. It is part of a large business complex that includes the twin 17-story towers of One and Two Ravinia Drive, a 15-story Crowne Plaza Hotel and a park.

The tower is used mostly for commercial office space. It is part of the Perimeter Center business district, and is also the regional headquarters for the Americas for InterContinental Hotels Group.

References

Buildings and structures completed in 1991
Buildings and structures in DeKalb County, Georgia
Skyscraper office buildings in Georgia (U.S. state)
Skyscrapers in Georgia (U.S. state)
1991 establishments in Georgia (U.S. state)